Meridian Medical Arts Charter High School is fully accredited high school operating within the West Ada School District. The school offers a comprehensive, health science-centered curriculum that also equips students with the tools they need to succeed as they progress to the post-secondary level. Included in its program are an associates degree (Associate of Science in Health Science) through Idaho State University, a wide array of concurrent credit opportunities, and certifications in CNA, EMT, and Health Information. MMACHS is designed to help springboard alumni into their Pre-Med, Nursing, Paramedics, and Medical Assisting degrees.

Notes

External links
MMACHS

Public high schools in Idaho
Charter schools in Idaho
Schools in Ada County, Idaho
Meridian, Idaho
2003 establishments in Idaho